The Wombles is a stop motion animated British television series made in 1973–1975, and also a second animated series for children based on the characters created by Elisabeth Beresford transmitted in 1997 and 1998. The Wombles had remained popular with children into the 1980s. After FilmFair was acquired by the Canadian company Cinar Films in 1996, a new series of episodes was made, with a number of new Womble characters. In the UK, the series was purchased by ITV.

A stop-motion animated series of five-minute episodes was made between 1973 and 1975, along with two half-hour specials. Narration and all Womble voices for these were provided by Bernard Cribbins.

Further animated episodes, using new animation models and sets, were made by Cinar/Filmfair in 1998–1999. These were ten minutes long and had several Canadian actors provide the voices. Background music was adapted from the Wombles' records along with new compositions.

A new television series of The Wombles was announced in 2013. Richard Desmond snapped up the rights to the new TV series which would have consisted of 26 episodes each 11 minutes in length. The new series was set to be made using computer-generated imagery (CGI) and was due to air in 2015 on Channel 5. As of 2022 no further development on the series has confirmed other than its animated shorts on social media.

1973 series

Series 1 (1973)
Orinoco & The Big Black Umbrella (5 February 1973): Orinoco goes for a spin on a windy day.
The Rocking Chair (6 February 1973): Great Uncle Bulgaria's rocking chair breaks and Orinoco gets stuck in a tyre.
A Sticky Ending (or A Sticky End) (7 February 1973)
Great Uncle Bulgaria's Keep Fit Lesson (9 February 1973): Great Uncle Bulgaria relives his younger years with a football.
A Safe Place (12 February 1973): Great Uncle Bulgaria needs somewhere to store an old history book.
Peep-Peep-Peep (13 February 1973): Wellington invents a telephone using cans and string.
The Purple Paw Mystery (14 February 1973): Tomsk makes a mess of making ink.
Bungo's Birthday Party (16 February 1973): Bungo thinks the others have forgotten his birthday.
The Invisible Womble (19 February 1973): Orinoco becomes convinced he's become invisible.
Orinoco Sees The Light (20 February 1973)
The Conkering Hero (21 February 1973): Wellington finds a new use for conkers.
One Pair Of Feet (23 February 1973): Wellington nearly gets spotted by a Human Being and is saved via a cardboard box.
Tobermory On Television (26 February 1973): Tobermory puts on his own TV show.
Crossed Lines (27 February 1973)
Blow The Womble Down (28 February 1973)
Madame Cholet Returns (2 March 1973)
Weighing In Time (18 June 1973): Orinoco is shamed into exercising by a new weighing machine.
Musical Wombles (19 June 1973)
Wombles And Ladders (20 June 1973)
Orinoco And The Ghost (21 June 1973): Orinoco is reluctant to go out at night after hearing a scary story.
A Game Of Golf (22 June 1973)
North, South, East, West (25 June 1973)
The Picnic (26 June 1973): Tomsk and Bungo foolishly trust Orinoco to carry their picnic basket.
Games In The Snow (27 June 1973)
The Snow Wombles (28 June 1973)
What's Cooking? (29 June 1973): The Burrow chimney is blocked
Spring Cleaning Time (2 July 1973)
Marrow Pie (4 July 1973): Orinoco grows a marrow.
The Cement Mixer (5 July 1973)
The Circus Comes To Wimbledon (6 July 1973): The young Wombles put on circus acts.

Series 2 (1975)
Bungo Up A Tree (15 September 1975): Bungo gets stuck up a tree.
Time And Slow Motion (16 September 1975): Tobermory organises the young Wombles' tidying-up methods.
Tomsk In Trouble (17 September 1975)
The Largest Womble In The World (18 September 1975): Orinoco uses a coat and a pair of boots to trick Bungo and Tomsk.
Running Out Of Steam (19 September 1975): Wellington, Tomsk and Bungo make their own train.
Orinoco's Midnight Feast (22 September 1975): Orinoco's greed ruins a midnight feast.
Speak Up (23 September  1975): Tomsk accidentally joins the water pipe to the telephone pipe
The Vanishing Pancake (24 September 1975)
Madame Cholet & the Blackberries (25 September 1975): Nobody will pick any blackberries, and that makes Madame Cholet angry.
The Fruit Machine (26 September 1975): Orinoco and Wellington make a 'mid-morning snack machine'.
Portrait Of Great Uncle Bulgaria (29 September 1975): Great Uncle Bulgaria's portrait is ruined.
Very Behind The Times (30 September 1975)
Burrow Hot Line (1 October 1975)
Trunk Call (2 October 1975): Tomsk gets stuck in a hollow tree trunk.
MacWomble The Terrible (3 October 1975): A Scottish relative comes to stay.
A Single Piper (6 October 1975)
Porridge For Breakfast (7 October 1975)
Highland Games (8 October 1975)
Home Sickness (9 October 1975)
Goodbye MacWomble (10 October 1975)
Hiccups (13 October 1975): Tomsk and Bungo get hiccups after eating hot buttercup crumpets.
Film Show (14 October 1975): Wellington makes a film about the Wimbledon Burrow.
Pirate Gold (15 October 1975): Tomsk and Wellington hunt for pirate treasure.
Warm & Cosy (16 October 1975): The Wimbledon Burrow needs insulating.
Autumn Leaves (17 October 1975): Wellington, Orinoco and Tomsk invent a new way to collect fallen leaves.
The Wombles Times (20 October 1975): The young Wombles make their own newspaper.
Operation W.R.A.P. (21 October 1975): The young Wombles learn first aid.
The Secret Snorer (22 October 1975): Orinoco is tasked with guarding the Wombles' herb garden.
Womble Fool's Day (23 October 1975): The young Wombles play practical jokes.
Womble Summer Party (24 October 1975): The young Wombles perform magic tricks.

Specials (1990–1991) 
 World Womble Day (1990 - 25 mins special for CITV): The Wimbledon Wombles plan a surprise party for Great Uncle Bulgaria's 300th birthday.
 The Wandering Wombles (1991 - 25 mins special for CITV)

1997 series

Series 1 (1997)

Series 2 (1998)

Series 3 (1998)

References 

Wombles
Wombles
The Wombles